is a deceased Japanese professional shogi player who achieved the rank of 8-dan and was awarded the rank of 9-dan after his death.

Early life

Yamada was born on December 11, 1933, in Nagoya, Aichi.

Shogi professional

Yamada died at the young age of 36 when he was still competing in the top A class of the Meijin ranking tournament system (順位戦 jun'isen), which is generally indicative of a strong player. He had been in the A class for six years and died during his seventh year.

He was a professional player for nineteen years.

He influenced modern shogi players in his pioneering use of game databases, holding research study groups, and leading a serious ascetic lifestyle.

Promotion history

Kanai's promotion history is as follows:

 1949: entered as an apprentice
 1951: 4-dan
 1964: 8-dan
 1970, June 18: 9-dan (awarded posthumously)

Titles and other championships

Yamada won the Kisei title twice – both in 1967 when he defeated Yasuharu Ōyama and Makoto Nakahara, respectively, in the first and second tournament of that year. Besides these two wins, Yamada was a competitor in four other title matches (for a total of 6 title match appearances). He was unable to defend his Kisei title in 1968 losing to Nakahara and again challenged for the Kisei in 1969 also losing to Nakahara. He was a challenger for the Meijin and Ōshō titles both against Ōyama in 1965.

He won a total of 9 non-title tournaments during his career.

References

1933 births
1970 deaths
Japanese shogi players
Deceased professional shogi players
People from Nagoya
Professional shogi players from Aichi Prefecture
Kisei (shogi)